The 1996 Asian Men's Junior Handball Championship (5th tournament) took place in Dubai from 21 August–30 August. It acts as the Asian qualifying tournament for the 1997 Men's Junior World Handball Championship.

Preliminary round
The top two finishers from each preliminary round group progressed to the next round.

Elimination round

,  and  won their Elimination matches and advanced to the final round.

Final round

Placement 7th–9th

Placement 4th–6th

Championship

Final standing

External links
www.asianhandball.com

H
H
Asia
Asian Handball Championships